The Pilot/Observer Badge was a World War II German military decoration awarded to Luftwaffe service personnel who had already been awarded the Pilot's Badge and Observer Badge. It was instituted on 26 March 1936 by the Commander in Chief of the Luftwaffe Hermann Göring. It was worn on the lower part of the left breast pocket of the service tunic, underneath the Iron Cross 1st Class if awarded. It was to replace the older 1933 Aircrew Badge.

The badge was originally manufactured in bronze, and later zinc. The badge can be distinguished from the Pilot's Badge by the gold wreath; the Pilot's Badge had a silver wreath. There was also a cloth version of the badge which used embroidered bullion for the officer's version and cotton for the NCO's version. The presentation case was dark blue, with a blue satin top liner and a blue velvet bottom liner on the inside.

Badge in Gold with Diamonds

The exclusive variant of the Pilot/Observer Badge in Gold with Diamonds. It was bestowed by Göring to honour exceptional achievement and on rare occasions as an honorary award. The first recipients were General Walther Wever, Chief of the Luftwaffe General Staff  and General der Flieger Erhard Milch, State Secretary of the Reichsluftfahrtministerium on 11 November 1935.

Another variant of this award was presented to Flug-Kapitänin Hanna Reitsch. This variation was "more like a brooch". A horizontal "shaft" extended from each side of the wreath, which also had diamonds inlaid.

Recipients

Luftwaffe
Reichsmarschall Hermann Göring
General Walther Wever (Chief-of-General Staff Luftwaffe) - 11 November 1935
General Erhard Milch (State Secretary of the Reichsluftfahrtministerium) - 11 November 1935
General der Flieger Hugo Sperrle - 19 November 1937
Major Werner Mölders - mid August 1940
Major Helmut Wick
Hautpmann Werner Baumbach - mid August 1940
Major Adolf Galland - mid August 1940
General Wolfram Freiherr von Richthofen - mid August 1940
Generaloberst Kurt Student - 2 September 1941
General der Flieger Friedrich Christiansen – fall of 1940
General der Flieger Günther Korten (Chief of the Luftwaffe General Staff) - 1941 (for the Invasion of Crete)
General der Flieger Josef Kammhuber
Generaloberst Alexander Löhr - 1940
Oberstleutnant Hans-Ulrich Rudel - summer of 1944
Oberst Bernd von Brauchitsch (Chief adjudant of the Reichsmarschall) - summer 1944
Hauptmann Erich Hartmann - August 1944
Generalmajor Martin Harlinghausen - 17 April 1945
Hauptmann Hans-Joachim Marseille
Oberst Dietrich Peltz
Generalfeldmarschall Robert Ritter von Greim
Generalfeldmarschall Albert Kesselring
Generaloberst Otto Dessloch
Generalleutnant Karl Angerstein
Oberst Walter Oesau - 17 October 1943
Flug-Kapitänin Hanna Reitsch - March 1941
Flug-Kapitänin Melitta Schenk Gräfin von Stauffenberg 1943
Generaloberst Ernst Udet
Oberst Nicolaus von Below 
Oberst Hajo Herrmann
 Generaloberst Alfred Keller

Honorary recipients
Reichsführer-SS Heinrich Himmler - July 1942
Großadmiral Karl Dönitz (Oberbefehlshaber der Kriegsmarine) - 1943
SS-Sturmbannführer Otto Skorzeny - fall of 1944
SS-Oberstgruppenführer and Generaloberst of the Waffen-SS Sepp Dietrich
Generalfeldmarshall Erwin Rommel
Generalfeldmarschall Erich von Manstein

Foreign recipients
Carl Gustaf Emil Mannerheim (Marshal of Finland) - 1942
Marschall Ion Antonescu (Prime Minister of Romania)
Regent Miklós Horthy (Regent of Hungary)
Italo Balbo (Italian Aviator) 
Francisco Franco (Spanish dictator)
Prince Regent Paul of Yugoslavia - 1939
Benito Mussolini (Prime Minister of the Kingdom of Italy) - 1937

Notes

References 

Military awards and decorations of Nazi Germany
Awards established in 1936
1936 establishments in Germany
Hermann Göring
1945 disestablishments in Germany